The State of the Art Is Failure is the second and final album by rapper Eprhyme with his group Saints of Everyday Failures. It was released on March 21, 2006 through Old Growth Records, with production by My Left Foot, Tha Goonie, Smoke M2D6, and Paul Schrag. Among the album's featured artists are members of Typical Cats, Oldominion, and Shape Shifters, including Awol One, 2Mex, and Sleep.

Track listing

Personnel
Saints of Everyday Failures
Eprhyme – MC
D-Scribe – MC
Tha Goonie – production

Other
My Left Foot, Smoke M2D6, Paul Schrag – production
Compost, Awol One, Denizen Kane, Mestizo, AKA, Brad B, XPERIENCE, Arpeggio, Feest, Jacob's Ladder, Jamie Clemens, Glimpse, Onry Ozzborn, Barly, Existereo, Akuma, Toni Hill, James Martinez, 2Mex, Biru, Matre, Sleep, Syndel – guest rapping

References 

Eprhyme albums
2006 albums